James of Ireland, O.F.M. (fl. 1316–1330) was an Irish Franciscan friar and explorer.

Biography
James of Ireland was the companion of Friar Odoric of Pordenone on his travels as far as Sumatra and China. After Odoric's death, the commune of Udine, (Friuli in north-eastern Italy), voted a sum of money to James for travelling with their fellow citizen.

See also
 Catald
 Fulco of Ireland
 Ursus of Aosta
 Colman nepos Cracavist

Sources
 A New History of Ireland, volume one, p. 981.

Irish Friars Minor
14th-century Irish Roman Catholic priests
Franciscan missionaries
Irish Roman Catholic missionaries
Irish explorers
Explorers of Asia
Irish expatriates in Italy
Roman Catholic missionaries in China
Irish Franciscans